"You Stepped Out of a Dream" is a popular song with music written by Nacio Herb Brown and lyrics by Gus Kahn that was published in 1940. The song has become a pop and jazz standard, with many recorded versions.

It was a centerpiece in the 1941 musical Ziegfeld Girl, in which it was sung by Tony Martin and accompanied an iconic image of Lana Turner walking down a grand staircase. Although Turner never officially sang or recorded the song, it became her theme song during her peak years as one of Hollywood's top leading ladies, often played when she entered a nightclub or restaurant. The song is played in the film The Abominable Dr. Phibes (1971) during a murder scene.

The song was added to the Chichester/London 2012 Revival version of the musical Singin' in the Rain.

Other versions
 Dave Brubeck – 1950
 Peter Cincotti
 Nat King Cole
 Ray Conniff
 Eddie Lockjaw Davis
 Teddy Edwards
 The Four Freshmen
 Art Garfunkel
 Stan Getz – 1950
 Dexter Gordon – A Swingin' Affair (1962)
 Johnny Griffin and Martial Solal – In and Out (1999)
 Johnny Hartman – This One's for Tedi (1985)
 Shirley Horn – You Won't Forget Me (1990)
 Barney Kessel – Kessel Plays Standards (1955)
 Kay Kyser
 Guy Lombardo
 Warne Marsh
 Johnny Mathis – Wonderful, Wonderful (1957)
 Glenn Miller with Ray Eberle – 1941
 Brew Moore
 Lennie Niehaus – Vol.1: The Quintets (1954)
 Sonny Rollins with J. J. Johnson – Sonny Rollins, Vol. 2 (1957)
 George Shearing – 1941
 Archie Shepp
 McCoy Tyner – Fly with the Wind (1976)
 Teddy Weatherford
 Julie London - Julie at Home (1960)
 Ilse Huizinga - Out of a Dream (1997)
Anthony Braxton - Five Pieces 1975 (1975)

References

 Who Wrote that Song Dick Jacobs & Harriet Jacobs, published by Writer's Digest Books, 1993

Songs with music by Nacio Herb Brown
Songs with lyrics by Gus Kahn
1940 songs
Johnny Mathis songs
Liza Minnelli songs
Nat King Cole songs
1940s jazz standards